Upper Red House, Llanvihangel-Ystern-Llewern, Monmouthshire, Wales is a farmhouse of the late 17th century. Standing one kilometre south west of the parish church, the building is little altered from the time of its construction and has a Grade II* listing.

History and description
The architectural historian John Newman, in his Gwent/Monmouthshire volume of the Pevsner Buildings of Wales series, notes the house has two storeys and three bays, under a hipped roof. The style is "Renaissance", with a centrally positioned chimney stack, which was "rare" in Monmouthshire. The building is of English bond brick, which has been colour washed red.

Notes

References 
 

Grade II* listed buildings in Monmouthshire
Houses in Monmouthshire
Farmhouses in Wales
Houses completed in the 17th century
Vernacular architecture in Wales
Grade II* listed houses in Wales